The province of Alberta has several ghost towns that have been completely or partially abandoned. Many of Alberta's ghost towns exist as a result of a number of failed coal mining operations in the area during the early 20th century.

Ghost towns are communities that once had a considerable population, that have since dwindled in numbers causing some or all its business to close, either due to the rerouting of a highway, train tracks being pulled, or exhaustion of some natural resource.



List of ghost towns

See also 

List of census divisions of Alberta
List of communities in Alberta
List of ghost towns in Canada
List of hamlets in Alberta
List of Indian reserves in Alberta
List of localities in Alberta
List of municipal districts in Alberta
List of municipalities in Alberta
List of towns in Alberta
List of villages in Alberta

References

External links
 Alberta ghost towns
 Canadian geographical names database

 
Alberta
Ghost Towns